The Central School, also known as Laurinburg Graded School, is a historic school building located at Laurinburg, Scotland County, North Carolina.  The original section was designed by architect Oliver Duke Wheeler and built in 1909–1910.  It is a two-story, brick building in Neoclassical style.  The main entrance features a prominent central portico with four Doric order columns.  Two-story flanking wings were added in 1939, and additions to the wings were made in 1948 and 1949 and designed by Leslie Boney.  The school closed in 2000.

It was listed on the National Register of Historic Places in 2005.

References

School buildings on the National Register of Historic Places in North Carolina
Neoclassical architecture in North Carolina
School buildings completed in 1910
Buildings and structures in Scotland County, North Carolina
National Register of Historic Places in Scotland County, North Carolina